Cormac Murphy-O'Connor (24 August 1932 – 1 September 2017) was a British cardinal, the Archbishop of Westminster and president of the Catholic Bishops' Conference of England and Wales. He was made cardinal by Pope John Paul II in 2001. He submitted his resignation as archbishop on reaching his 75th birthday in 2007; Pope Benedict XVI accepted it on 3 April 2009.

By virtue of his position as Archbishop of Westminster, Murphy-O'Connor was sometimes referred to as the Catholic Primate of England and Wales. However, though the holders within the Church of England of the posts of Archbishop of Canterbury and Archbishop of York are called the "Primate of All England" and "Primate of England" respectively, the title of primate has never been used by the de facto leaders of the Catholic Church in England and Wales.

Early life 
Cormac Murphy-O'Connor was born on 24 August 1932 in Reading, Berkshire, the fifth son of George Murphy-O'Connor, a G.P., and Ellen (née Cuddigan; died 1971), who emigrated from County Cork in Ireland before the First World War and married in 1921. The Murphy-O'Connor family was middle class, with the men becoming doctors or priests, and one in each generation taking over the family business as wine merchants 'to the clergy and gentry of Southern Ireland'. A forebear, Daniel Murphy, became the first Archbishop of Hobart, Tasmania, in 1888, having served as a bishop there since 1865. Two of his uncles, one aunt, two cousins and two of his brothers, Brian (1930–2012) and Patrick, were also ordained or members of religious orders. His youngest brother, John, was a regular officer in the Royal Artillery who died of renal cell carcinoma; he had two other siblings, James (a doctor and rugby player) and Catherine. His cousin, Jerome Murphy-O'Connor, was a Dominican priest and expert on St Paul who served as Professor of New Testament at the École Biblique in Jerusalem from 1967 to his death in 2013. After attending Presentation College in Reading and Prior Park College in Bath, in 1950 Murphy-O'Connor followed his brother Brian to the Venerable English College in Rome and began his studies for the priesthood, where he received a degree in theology. Thereafter, he earned a licentiate in philosophy and a Licentiate of Sacred Theology degree from the Pontifical Gregorian University. He was ordained on 28 October 1956, by Cardinal Valerio Valeri. For the next decade he was engaged in pastoral ministry in Portsmouth and Fareham.

Church career

Parish priest 
In 1966, Murphy-O'Connor became the private secretary to Bishop Derek Worlock of Portsmouth. In September 1970, he was appointed parish priest of the Immaculate Conception church in Portswood, Southampton. Soon afterwards, in late 1971, he was appointed rector of the Venerable English College, his alma mater. As rector he hosted the Anglican Archbishop of Canterbury, Donald Coggan, on his historic visit to Pope Paul VI in 1977.

Bishop 
On 17 November 1977, Murphy-O'Connor was named Bishop of Arundel and Brighton by Pope Paul VI. He received his episcopal consecration on the following 21 December from Bishop Michael Bowen, with Archbishop George Dwyer and Bishop Anthony Emery serving as co-consecrators. He held important positions among the bishops of Europe and has also been consistently influential in ecumenical work; from 1982 to 2000 he was a co-chairman of the Anglican–Roman Catholic International Commission. In 2000 he was awarded the Lambeth degree of Doctor of Divinity by the Archbishop of Canterbury, George Carey, in recognition of his work for Christian unity.

Archbishop and cardinal 

Murphy-O'Connor was appointed the tenth Archbishop of Westminster, and thus head of the Catholic Church in England and Wales, on 15 February 2000; in November of that year he was elected President of the Catholic Bishops' Conference of England and Wales.

In the consistory of 21 February 2001 he was created Cardinal-Priest of Santa Maria sopra Minerva by Pope John Paul II.

He was appointed to four curial organisations: the Congregation for Divine Worship and the Discipline of the Sacraments, the Administration of the Patrimony of the Holy See, the Pontifical Council for the Study of Organisational and Economic Problems of the Holy See, and the Pontifical Council for the Family. He also served on the Pontifical Councils for Culture and for Laity, and was secretary of the Vox Clara commission which oversees the translating of liturgical texts from Latin into English.

Murphy-O'Connor belonged to a group of approximately a dozen like-minded cardinals and bishops – all Europeans – who met annually from 1995 to 2006 in St. Gallen, Switzerland, to discuss reforms with respect to the appointment of bishops, collegiality, bishops' conferences, the primacy of the papacy and sexual morality; they differed among themselves, but shared the view that Cardinal Joseph Ratzinger was not the sort of candidate they hoped to see elected at the next conclave.

In August 2001, Murphy-O'Connor was created a Freeman of the City of London.

In January 2002, he preached during the Anglican morning service at Sandringham, the first time a Roman Catholic prelate delivered a sermon to an English monarch since 1680. In 2002, in Westminster Abbey, he was the first cardinal to read prayers at an English Royal Funeral Service (for the Queen Mother) since 1509. In 2002 he had his portrait painted for Westminster Cathedral by the artist Christian Furr. In advance of the 2005 papal conclave, where Murphy-O'Conner served as a cardinal elector, Cardinal Achille Silvestrini told reporters to watch for Murphy-O'Connor to emerge as a possible new pope.

He was ineligible to participate in the 2013 conclave due to being aged over 80. In a piece for the BBC in the lead up to the 2013 conclave, Murphy O'Connor recorded his experiences of the 2005 conclave that elected Benedict XVI, remembering as the doors closed to the conclave, "One of us will be going out with a white cassock on". The cardinal also referenced that he personally had three names in mind for himself in the unlikely event that he was elected as pope, settling on Adrian, Gregory, or Benedict.

On 28 October 2006, Murphy-O'Connor celebrated 50 years of ordination with a Jubilee Mass in Westminster Cathedral.

Retirement 

Shortly before reaching the mandatory retirement age of 75, Murphy-O'Connor submitted his resignation as Archbishop of Westminster to Pope Benedict XVI, who asked that Murphy-O'Connor remain in his position "until he chooses otherwise". On 3 April 2009 Benedict appointed Vincent Nichols as Murphy-O'Connor's replacement. All Murphy O'Connor's predecessors died in office, so he was the first Archbishop Emeritus of Westminster. He lived the remainder of his life in semi-retirement in Duke's Avenue, Chiswick, London.

On 30 October 2009, Pope Benedict appointed Murphy-O'Connor a member of the Congregation for Bishops, a post he held until his 80th birthday. It was unusual to receive such an appointment after retirement.

In June 2010, after the Ryan Report and Murphy Report on the abuses by the Catholic Church in Ireland, Murphy-O'Connor was named along with others to oversee the apostolic visitation of certain dioceses and seminaries. Murphy-O'Connor was named as the visitor to the Diocese of Armagh and its suffragan sees.

Murphy-O'Connor, in a speech delivered on 17 May 2012 at Leicester's Anglican cathedral, said, "In the name of tolerance it seems to me tolerance is being abolished." He said:

A friend of Pope Francis, he was a hardliner with regard to sexual child abuse cases. In 2018, the dioceses of Arundel and Brighton, Westminster, Portsmouth and Northampton were put under the so-called "Truth Project", a government-commissioned investigation which asked to the Archdiocese of Westminster to release his files pertaining to the minor victims'allegations.

Murphy-O'Connor died of cancer on 1 September 2017 after an extended hospital stay. He was buried under the 10th Station of the Cross in Westminster Cathedral. As he was the 10th Archbishop of Westminster, and also because this station is directly opposite the Chapel of St Patrick, he was buried there in accordance with his wishes due to his Irish connection with County Cork in Ireland.

Views

Abuse scandal 

Murphy-O'Connor found himself subject to public scrutiny regarding a priest in his diocese when he was Bishop of Arundel and Brighton. During this time it was brought to his attention that a priest, Michael Hill, was a sexual abuser of children. In 2000, when Murphy O'Connor became Archbishop of Westminster, the case became known to the general public.

Instead of reporting Hill to the police, Murphy-O'Connor allowed the crime to be covered up and transferred Hill to Gatwick Airport chapel, where the Cardinal believed he would not be able to molest children. In 1997, Hill was convicted as a child molester and jailed for sexually assaulting nine children. After three years in jail, Hill was given another five years for assaulting three other boys.

Islam 
In 2004, the Muslim Council of Britain criticised Murphy-O'Connor when he said that Muslim leaders were not doing enough to denounce terrorists who carried out attacks "in the name of Allah", while clarifying that they denounced terrorism.

Response to Summorum Pontificum 
In July 2007, Murphy-O'Connor welcomed Pope Benedict XVI's relaxation of restrictions on the use of the 1962 Roman Missal. He said:

When he issued a letter implementing the pope's rules to the clergy of his diocese in November, he was criticized in some quarters for requiring parish priests to request permission before Mass could be celebrated in that traditional form.

AIDS prevention 

On 3 December 2006, Murphy-O'Connor issued a response to a statement made by Prime Minister Tony Blair on World AIDS Day (1 December 2006) in which Blair said, "The danger is if we have a sort of blanket ban from religious hierarchy saying it's wrong to do it, then you discourage people from doing it in circumstances where they need to protect their lives." In response to this Murphy-O'Connor said,

Status of immigrants 
On 7 May 2007, Murphy-O'Connor addressed a crowd of undocumented immigrants in Trafalgar Square in support of the Strangers into Citizens campaign, which advocates a path to citizenship for undocumented workers. Previously he had commissioned major research on the pastoral challenges migrants present in his parishes, which received widespread press coverage when published as The Ground of Justice.

Adoption by same-sex couples 
In early 2007, Murphy-O'Connor sent a letter to Tony Blair opposing pending regulations extending to same-sex couples the right to adopt on the same basis as different-sex couples. He said that the law would force people to "act against the teaching of the Church and their own consciences" with regard to Catholic adoption agencies and requested an exemption from the law. He continued:

Family planning 
Murphy-O'Connor denounced contraception and abortion many times. In February 2008 he ordered the board of St John and St Elizabeth's Hospital, a Catholic hospital partly funded by the NHS, to resign because its general practice prescribed the morning-after pill and issued abortion referrals.

In February 2013, Murphy-O'Connor said that while a radical departure from previous teaching was not likely, it would be "wise" to focus on "what's good and what's true" about marriage and family life instead. He said:

Embryo bill 
In March 2008, Murphy-O'Connor joined Cardinal Keith O'Brien of Scotland in opposing the government's proposed embryology bill. The government had instructed its MPs to vote for the bill, which angered some Catholic MPs. Murphy-O'Connor said "Certainly, there are some aspects of this bill on which I believe there ought to be a free vote, because Catholics and others will want to vote according to their conscience." The government gave in to the pressure and promised to allow MPs a free vote.

Atheism 
In 2008, Murphy-O'Connor urged Christians to treat atheists and agnostics with deep esteem, "because the hidden God is active in their lives as well as in the lives of those who believe". However, in 2009, speaking after Archbishop Vincent Nichols' installation, he said that a lack of faith is "the greatest of evils."

Iraq War 
Murphy-O'Connor opposed the Iraq War.

Distinctions
  House of Bourbon-Two Sicilies: Knight Grand Cross of Justice of the Sacred Military Constantinian Order of Saint George

References

External links
 Biography, Holy See Press Office

1932 births
2017 deaths
20th-century Roman Catholic bishops in England
Roman Catholic archbishops of Westminster
Cardinals created by Pope John Paul II
Deaths from cancer in England
21st-century British cardinals
English College, Rome alumni
English people of Irish descent
Members of the Congregation for Bishops
Members of the Congregation for Divine Worship and the Discipline of the Sacraments
Members of the Congregation for the Evangelization of Peoples
Members of the Pontifical Council for Culture
People educated at Elvian School
People educated at Prior Park College
People from Reading, Berkshire
Pontifical Gregorian University alumni
Recipients of the Order of Saint Lazarus (statuted 1910)
Rectors of the English College, Rome
Roman Catholic bishops of Arundel and Brighton
21st-century Roman Catholic archbishops in the United Kingdom